Westfield School may refer to:

United Kingdom
 Westfield School, Bourne, in Lincolnshire
 Westfield School, Bourne End, a special school in Buckinghamshire
 Westfield School, Newcastle upon Tyne, in Tyne and Wear
 Westfield School, Sheffield, in South Yorkshire
 Westfield Community Technology College, in Watford, Hertfordshire
Westfield Primary School, in Berkhamsted, Hertfordshire
Former name of Westfield Academy, Yeovil, in Somerset

United States

 The Westfield School, a private PK-12 school in Perry, Georgia
 Westfield Community School, a K-8 school in Algonquin, Illinois

See also
 Westfield High School (disambiguation)
 Westfield Schools (disambiguation)